The Trégonce is a river of France which flows in the department of Indre, in the Centre-Val de Loire region. It is a  right tributary of the river Indre. The Trégonce has a tributary stream, the Fontaines.

References

Rivers of France
Rivers of Centre-Val de Loire
Rivers of Indre